Anne M. Mulcahy (born October 21, 1952) is the former chairperson and CEO of Xerox Corporation. She was named CEO of Xerox on August 1, 2001, and chairwoman on January 1, 2002. In addition to serving on the Xerox board, she has been a member of the boards of directors of Catalyst, Citigroup Inc., Fuji Xerox Co. Ltd. and Target Corporation.

She was selected as 'CEO of the Year 2008' by Chief Executive magazine. She announced her retirement as CEO on May 21, 2009, prior to the company's annual shareholder meeting.

Early life and education
Mulcahy was born in Rockville Centre, New York on October 21, 1952. She was the only daughter in her family and attended Catholic school as a child. She received a B.A. in English and Journalism from Marymount College of Fordham University in Tarrytown, New York.

Career at Xerox
Mulcahy joined Xerox as a field sales representative in 1976 and rose through the ranks. From 1992 to 1995, Mulcahy was vice president for human resources, responsible for compensation, benefits, human resource strategy, labor relations, management development, and employee training. She became a chief staff officer in 1997 and corporate senior vice president in 1998. Prior to that, she served as vice president and staff officer for Customer Operations, covering South America and Central America, Europe, Asia, Africa, and China.
 Though never intent on running Xerox, she was selected by the board of directors in 2001. Later in her tenure, she ordered a restructuring that cut annual expenses by $1.7 billion, cut the workforce by 25,000 jobs, and sold $2.3 billion in non-core assets to reduce Xerox's long-term debt. 

When she became CEO on Aug 1, 2001, the stock price was $8.25, and on Jan 1, 2002. when she became chairwoman. the stock price was $10.05. On May 21, 2009, the day she announced her retirement as CEO, the stock price was $6.82.

Mulcahy served on four other Boards of Directors besides Xerox. She also served on Catalyst, Citigroup, Fuji Xerox, and Target Corp. A letter sent to Citi shareholders on March 26, 2009, by the labor union, American Federation of State County & Municipal Employees (AFSCME), recommended shareholders vote against re-electing six of their directors

Magazine Opinion
The Wall Street Journal named Mulcahy one of 50 women to watch in 2005 and Forbes magazine ranked her at the sixth position among the Most Powerful Women in America in 2005. In 2009, she was ranked 15th. In 2008, she was selected by U.S. News & World Report as one of America's Best Leaders.

References

|-

|-

1952 births
American chief executives of manufacturing companies
American technology chief executives
American women chief executives
Directors of Xerox
Fordham University alumni
Living people
People from Rockville Centre, New York
Xerox people
21st-century American women